Don't Trust Anyone But Us is the first full-length album released by Ellegarden on April 3, 2002.

Track listing
My Favorite Song - 3:42
Santa Claus (サンタクロース) - 3:59
Can You Feel Like I Do - 4:47
Bare Foot - 3:47
Yubiwa (指輪, Ring) - 4:19
Tsuki (月, Moon) - 2:57
45 - 4:35
Kaze no Hi (風の日, Windy Day) - 4:12
Middle of Nowhere - 3:52
Lonesome - 5:04
Sliding Door - 2:51
The End of the World -Album Mix- - 4:03

Charts

References

Ellegarden albums
2002 albums